Chaetoceros furcellatus is an Arctic neritic diatom in the genus Chaetoceros. The easiest way to identify this species is by finding the very characteristic resting spores. C. furcellatus is a common and important species in the Barents sea.

Species description
Cells united into chains that can be long and slightly curved. Valve face is flat to slightly concave with a central inflation. The setae originate inside the valve margin. Resting spores occur in pairs fused by a basal plate, one setae sticks out on each side of the pair, perpendicular to the chain axis, and splits in two, half a cell length from the valve margin

References

External links
 Algaebase
 C.H. von Quillfeldt article

Species described in 1856
Coscinodiscophyceae